701 Brickell Avenue, is an office skyscraper in the Brickell district of Miami, Florida, United States. It is located on Brickell Avenue in the northern Brickell Financial District, just three blocks from Biscayne Bay. The tower was built in 1986 and opened as the Lincoln Center, it held that title until 2004.  It currently goes by its address, which is 701 Brickell, because there was already a building in Miami at the time that claimed the Bank of America appellation, and therefore it could not take that name. However, that specific building has since been renamed the Miami Tower. The building is currently owned by TIAA–CREF, which purchased it in November 2002.

Specifications
The building is 450 ft (150 m) tall, and contains 34 floors. When built, it was in the top ten tallest buildings in Miami. Now, however, it has been dwarfed by much taller surrounding buildings which have been built as part of the recent building boom in that city. The building contains 677,677 rentable square feet of Class A office space.

Gallery

See also
 List of tallest buildings in Miami

References

External links
 701 Brickell Avenue on Emporis

Office buildings completed in 1986
Skyscraper office buildings in Miami
1986 establishments in Florida